Thunakkadavu Dam is situated in Parambikulam Wildlife Sanctuary, Kerala across Thunacadavu River, which is a tributary of Parambikulam River, in Palakkad district of Kerala, India. It is part of the Parambikulam Aliyar (Irrigation) Project.This is a small balancing Reservoir with gross capacity is 557 Mcft. The water that is received from Prambikulam Reservoir and from the Peruvaripallam Reservoir, as well as from its own catchment, is diverted to the Sarkarpathy Power House through the Sarkarpathy Power Tunnel.

References

Dams in Kerala
Earth-filled dams
Dams completed in 1965
Buildings and structures in Palakkad district
1965 establishments in Kerala
20th-century architecture in India